Darreh Bidad-e Sofla (also Romanized as Darreh Bīdād-e Soflá and Darreh-ye Bīdād-e Soflá; also known as Darreh Bīdād) is a village in Shirvan Rural District, in the Central District of Borujerd County, Lorestan Province, Iran. At the 2006 census, its population was 34, in 7 families.

References 

Towns and villages in Borujerd County